Mitch Thomas was a Canadian international lawn bowls player who competed in the 1930 British Empire Games.

Bowls career
At the 1930 British Empire Games he won the silver medal in the rinks (fours) event with Harry Allen, Jimmy Campbell and Billy Rae.

References

Canadian male bowls players
Bowls players at the 1930 British Empire Games
Commonwealth Games silver medallists for Canada
Commonwealth Games medallists in lawn bowls
Medallists at the 1930 British Empire Games